Marcelo Arévalo and Miguel Ángel Reyes-Varela were the defending champions but only Arévalo chose to defend his title, partnering Roberto Maytín. Arévalo lost in the first round to Luis David Martínez and David Pérez Sanz.

Evan King and Hunter Reese won the title after defeating Fabrice Martin and Hugo Nys 6–4, 7–6(8–6) in the final.

Seeds

Draw

References
 Main Draw
 Qualifying Draw

Cary Challenger - Doubles
2018 Doubles